is a black-and-white Japanese film directed by Tadashi Sawashima.

References

External links

1957 films
Japanese black-and-white films
Films based on works by Jun'ichirō Tanizaki
Ninja films
Toei Company films
1950s Japanese films